I Love This Place is the seventh studio album by Australian country music artist Troy Cassar-Daley. The album was released in April 2009 and peaked at number 34 on the ARIA Charts.
  
At the ARIA Music Awards of 2009, it won the ARIA Award for Best Country Album; this is the fourth time Cassar-Daley has won this award.
At the 2010 Country Music Awards of Australia in Tamworth, Cassar-Daley won seven Gold Guitars, including Male Vocalist of the Year and Album of the Year.

Track listing

Charts

Weekly charts

Year-end charts

Release history

References

2009 albums
Troy Cassar-Daley albums
Liberation Records albums
ARIA Award-winning albums